Tenby Schools Penang is an international school in Penang, Malaysia, and part of the Tenby International School family. It offers both British curriculum (IGCSE) and Malaysian curriculum (UPSR, SPM) in the same campus for children aged 3–18 years old.

It was started by the Augustin family as Sekolah Sri Inai in the early 1980s as a Malaysian private school.

In 2007 it integrated a pre-existing Malaysian private school with a Tenby international school in one campus.

In 2011 the school was moved to a new campus in Tanjung Bungah, Penang. The capacity of the new site was 750 children.

Tenby International School also offers A-level studies from year 2013 onwards.

References

External links 

British international schools in Malaysia
Cambridge schools in Malaysia
Schools in Penang